Belle W. Y. Wei is an American electrical engineer and educator.   she is Carolyn Guidry Chair in Engineering Education and Innovative Learning at  San José State University.

Her other positions include Charles W. Davidson College of Engineering’s Don Beall Dean of Engineering at San José State University and Provost and Vice President for Academic Affairs at California State University, Chico.

Belle Wei received her B.S. in Biophysics from U.C. Berkeley, her M.S. in Engineering from Harvard University, and her Ph.D. in Electrical Engineering and Computer Sciences from U.C. Berkeley.

Awards and recognition
2012: Marie Pistilli Award. for her leadership in the promotion of engineering education. A Design Automation Conference press-release quotes Karen Bartleson, senior director of community marketing for Synopsys and chair of Women in Electronic Design saying during the award presentation: "Belle Wei, the first endowed dean at the SJSU College of Engineering, has spearheaded a long term transformation of the college to educate students to become engineers and immediate contributors in a global workplace".

References

Year of birth missing (living people)
Living people
American electrical engineers
San Jose State University faculty
Harvard School of Engineering and Applied Sciences alumni
UC Berkeley College of Letters and Science alumni
Electronic engineering award winners
UC Berkeley College of Engineering alumni